Aleph One is the second aleph number.

Aleph One may also refer to:
 Aleph One (game engine), an enhanced version of the Marathon 2 game engine
 Elias Levy, computer security professional, former moderator of Bugtraq
 Aleph-1 (album), a 2007 album by Alva Noto
 Alef-one French Film Production Company founded in 2018 by Nora Melhli and Jacques Arthur Essebag